Old, New, Ballads, Blues is the fifteenth solo album by Northern Irish blues guitarist and singer Gary Moore.

Track listing

Personnel
 Gary Moore - guitars, vocals
 Don Airey - keyboards
 Jonathan Noyce - bass
 Darrin Mooney - drums

References

Gary Moore albums
2006 albums